Aayiram Meni is a 1999 Indian Malayalam film, directed by I. V. Sasi, starring Manoj K. Jayan and Urvashi in the lead roles.

Cast

 Manoj K. Jayan  as Babuttan
 Divya Unni as Mallika
 Urvashi as Alice
 Lalu Alex as Varkey
 Jagadish as  Abdutty
 Ganesh Kumar as Lalichan
 Mala Aravindan as Sankaran
 Captain Raju as Unnithan
 Sai Kumar as Bharathan
 Mini Nair as Varkey's wife
 Tony as Murali
 Maathu as Lakshmi
 Chandni Shaju as Lilly
 Ashokan as Damu
 Sadiq as Keshavan
 Rajan P. Dev as Bhaskaran
 Augustine as Naanu
 Jose Pellissery as Kuriachan
 Bheeman Raghu as Maramadi Mamachan
 Biyon as Appu
KPAC Ramachandran as Velichappad
 Gayathri as Appu's mother
 Sidha Raj as Police Officer

References

External links

1999 films
1990s Malayalam-language films
Films directed by I. V. Sasi